"The Loneliness of the Long-Distance Runner" is a 1959 short story by Alan Sillitoe.

The Loneliness of the Long-Distance Runner may also refer to:

The Loneliness of the Long Distance Runner (film), a 1962 film adaptation of the story
The Loneliness of the Long-Distance Runner (short story collection), a 1959 collection by Sillitoe including the story
"The Loneliness of the Long Distance Runner", an Iron Maiden song from their 1986 album, Somewhere in Time

See also
"The Loneliness of the Long Distance Entrepreneur", a 1991 episode of the British series Minder
"The Loneliness of the Long Distance Granny", a short story by Ben Aaronovitch
"The Loneliness of the Long Distance Walker", a 1969 episode of the British series Dad's Army